Aero Country Airport  is a privately owned public airport  west of the central business district of McKinney, Texas, United States. The airport has no IATA or ICAO designation.

The airport is used solely for general aviation purposes.

Aero Country previously used the FAA LID of TX05 until at least July 1997. The FAA LID of T31 was previously used for Port Isabel-Cameron County Airport in Port Isabel, Texas until at least July 1992.

Facilities 
 Runway 17/35: 4,352 x 60 ft. (1,326 x 18 m), Surface: Asphalt/Turf

For the year ending December 31, 2015, the airport had 9,000 aircraft operations, averaging 25 per day: 100% general aviation. 244 aircraft were then based at this airport: 90% single-engine, 7% multi-engine, 2% helicopters, and 1% gliders.

Accidents and incidents 
 2 April 1983: Three passengers disembarked from a de Havilland Canada DHC-6 Twin Otter, registration number N927BA, while the engines were still running, despite having been instructed by the aircrew prior to the flight not to exit until the engines were shut down. One passenger walked into the rotating left-hand propeller and suffered a fatal head injury; the other passengers were not injured. The accident was attributed to inadequate verbal instructions and supervision of the passengers by the pilot in command, and to the failure of the passengers to understand the pilot's instructions. A contributing factor was unsafe actions by the passengers.
 19 July 1997: A Rans S-9, registration number N1678N, lost engine power after a high-speed pass over the runway. The pilot attempted to turn back and land, but the craft stalled and went into a spin during the "very tight" 180° turn. The S-9 impacted the ground in a near-vertical attitude, killing the pilot and sole occupant. The accident was attributed to "loss of engine power for undetermined reason(s), and failure of the pilot to maintain adequate airspeed, while maneuvering for a forced landing, which resulted in a stall and collision with the terrain."
 9 January 2001: A Nord 1101 Noralpha, registration number N208BF, lost engine power on takeoff and was badly damaged in a subsequent off-airport forced landing, seriously injuring the pilot; the single passenger suffered no injuries. The aft throttle linkage assembly's push/pull rod was found separated from the support bushing. The accident was attributed to "the loss of engine power during takeoff resulting from the inadequate engagement of the throttle torque tube rod end into the support bushing by unknown maintenance personnel."
 31 December 2016:  A Piper PA-28R-200 Arrow, registration number N4407T, and a Luscombe 8A, registration number N2889K, collided in mid-air in the airfield traffic pattern approximately 1/2 mi (0.8 km) east of the airport. The Piper crashed into a storage facility, starting a substantial fire that damaged a stored boat; the blaze thwarted bystanders' attempts to rescue the pilot, who was killed. The collision severed the empennage of the Luscombe, which then crashed in the southbound lanes of Custer Road near Virginia Parkway; the pilot and single passenger died. Investigators determined that neither aircraft maneuvered to avoid the collision and that both pilots had likely been unable to see the other's aircraft. The accident was attributed to "The [Piper] pilot's use of an alternate traffic pattern entry procedure, which resulted in his inability to see and avoid the other airplane, which was flying the preferred traffic pattern, and the subsequent midair collision."

References 
Notes

Citations

External links 
  at Texas DOT Airport Directory
 

Airports in Texas
Airports in the Dallas–Fort Worth metroplex
Transportation in Collin County, Texas